Ramanaickenpettai is a Village panchayat in Vaniyambadi of Tirupathur district of the Indian state of Tamil Nadu.

Geography 

It is located near a branch of the river Palar.

Yelagiri hill is located 23 km from here, a good hill station in Tirupattur district of Tamil Nadu, India, situated off the Vaniyambadi-Tirupattur road. Located at an altitude of 1,410 metres and spread across 30 km2, the Yelagiri village (also spelled Elagiri) is surrounded by orchards, rose-gardens, and green valleys.

Temples 

One mosque and eight temples are located there. Samundeswari Amman Temple is one of the famous temples of Ramanaickenpettai. Villages like Vadakkapattu, Avarankuppam, and others, are located next to the branch of the river Palar. Ramanaickenpettai is located nearly 12.1 km from Vaniyambadi bus stand and Vaniyambadi Railway Station.

The Samundeshwari Amman Temple is the scene of Samundeshwari Amman Thiru Viza, a festival, is held every five years. The Riverside Shiva and Ganesha temples are ancient.

Schools 

The following schools in the village:

 Government Higher Secondary School Ramanaickenpettai
 Arshiya Fathima matriculation high School
 Government Elementary School Ramanaickenpettai

The following schools out of the village:

Facilities 
The facilities in this village are mentioned 
 Library 
 Post Office
 Bank of Baroda branchg
 Hotel Thanigai
 Aavin milk buying and selling node
 Sri Ganesha Pyramid Meditation Center

Infrastructure and facilities 

Roads link it to Avarankkuppam, Ambalur, Puthukoil, Vaniyambadi, Thiruppatur, Nattrampalli, Kanakanachiyamman Temple, Andhra (West), Puthu koil and Natrampalli and Dasariyappanoor. The western side is bordered by the Palar river that forms the border of Andhra Pradesh State.

References 

Villages in Tirupathur district